John Komnenos Raoul Doukas Angelos Petraliphas (died ) was a Byzantine noble and military commander during the reign of Emperor Michael VIII Palaiologos.

Life
John Raoul Petraliphas was the eldest son of Alexios Raoul and an unnamed niece of the Emperor of Nicaea John III Vatatzes. He had three other brothers, of which two are known by name, the pinkernes Manuel and Isaac. The Raoul, as all families of the traditional aristocracy, suffered under Theodore II Laskaris who sought to reduce the nobility's power and influence. Laskaris instead favoured men of humble origin, chief among them the Mouzalon brothers. One of John's sisters was married to the emperor's protégé, George Mouzalon, while John and his brothers were imprisoned (the exact date is not clear).

Consequently, the family actively supported the murder the Mouzalon brothers in 1258, following Theodore II's death. After the subsequent usurpation of Michael VIII Palaiologos, they were rewarded with high state offices: following his military successes in the next few years, John was named protovestiarios, inheriting the title from George Mouzalon. In 1259, Michael sent John along with John Palaiologos and Alexios Strategopoulos in a campaign against the Epirote-Achaean alliance in Macedonia, which ended with the decisive Nicaean victory at the Battle of Pelagonia. Following the victory, Strategopoulos and Raoul marched into Epirus, seizing Arta and besieging Ioannina. Their achievements, however, were quickly undone by John Doukas, the bastard son of the Epirote ruler. Nothing further is known of him, except that he died .

Family
In 1261, John married Theodora Palaiologina Kantakouzene, the niece of Michael VIII and widow of George Mouzalon. With her, he had at least two daughters, Irene and Anna. Irene married the porphyrogennetos Constantine Palaiologos, the third son of Michael VIII.

References

Sources

1270s deaths
13th-century Byzantine people
Byzantine generals
John
Byzantine prisoners and detainees
John
Year of birth unknown
People of the Empire of Nicaea
Protovestiarioi
Eastern Orthodox Christians from Greece